The 2022 Campbell Fighting Camels football team represented the Campbell University as a member of the Big South Conference during the 2022 NCAA Division I FCS football season. Led by tenth-year head coach Mike Minter, the Fighting Camels played their home games at the Barker–Lane Stadium in Buies Creek, North Carolina.

Previous season

The Fighting Camels finished the 2021 season with a record of 3–8, 2–5 Big South play to finish in a tie for last place.

Schedule

Game summaries

The Citadel

at No. 20 William & Mary

at East Carolina

North Carolina Central

Charleston Southern

Robert Morris

at No. 9 Jackson State

at North Carolina A&T

at Bryant

Gardner–Webb

at Delaware State

References

Campbell
Campbell Fighting Camels football seasons
Campbell Fighting Camels football